The 2019 Premier League Asia Trophy was the ninth edition of the Premier League Asia Trophy. Manchester City, Newcastle United, West Ham United and Wolverhampton Wanderers competed for the Premier League Asia Trophy. It was held in two cities for the first time, Nanjing and Shanghai, from 17 July to 20 July 2019.

Wolverhampton Wanderers won their first title following their 3–2 victory on penalties over Manchester City.

Results

All kick-off times are local (UTC+08:00)

Semi-finals

Third place play-off

Final

Goalscorers

2 goals

 Diogo Jota
 Raheem Sterling

1 goal

 Morgan Gibbs-White
 Lukas Nmecha
 Mark Noble
 David Silva
 Yoshinori Muto

1 own goal

 Thomas Allan

References

External links

Premier League Asia Trophy
Prem
Asia
2019
Premier League Asia Trophy